Kouceila Boualia (born March 14, 2001 in Ain El Hammam) is an Algerian footballer who plays for JS Kabylie in the Algerian Ligue Professionnelle 1.

JS Kabylie
In August 2021, Boualia signed a four year contract with JS Kabylie. In October 2021, Boualia tore his ACL in a pre-season friendly match.

References

External links
 

2001 births
Algeria A' international footballers
Algeria under-23 international footballers
Algerian Ligue Professionnelle 1 players
Algerian footballers
JS Kabylie players
Living people
People from Ain El Hammam
Footballers from Tizi Ouzou
Kabyle people